Kendi may refer to the following notable people:
Given or stage name
Kendi (musician) (born 1989), Serbian singer
Kendi Rosales (born 1990), Honduran sprinter

Surname
Ibram X. Kendi (born 1982), American author and historian
István Kendi (?–c.1628), Hungarian noble
János Kendi (?–1677), Hungarian jurist 
Sándor Kendi (?–1594), Hungarian noble

See also
Kendis